Thorganby is a small village and civil parish in the Selby
district of North Yorkshire, England. It was historically part of the East Riding of Yorkshire until 1974. According to the 2011 census the village had 330 residents. Children in the village attend Wheldrake with Thorganby C of E (Aided) Primary School, located in Wheldrake.

History
The village is mentioned in the Domesday Book as Torgrembi and was listed as belonging to Ralph Paynel, the lord in chief of the area. Thorganby derives from a personal name Thorgrim and the Old Norse bȳ, meaning farmstead or village.

A church is first recorded in 1228, when the advowson was appointed to Robert de Meynell. However, the present structure, St Helen's Church, which is a grade I listed building, dates from the 15th century. The church is in the ecclesiastical parish of Thorganby, which is in the Diocese of York.

The village is in the Selby District of North Yorkshire, but was previously in the Ouse and Derwent Wapentake of the East Riding of Yorkshire. The village is on the west bank of the River Derwent and is across the river from the Lower Derwent National Nature Reserve.

However, in 1913,  gained its own station on the newly opened Derwent Valley Light Railway, which provided a link between York and Selby. The station closed in 1926 to passengers, but remained open until 1964 for goods traffic.

In the 2001 census, the parish had 241 residents, and increasing by the 2011 census to 330. In 2015, North Yorkshire County Council estimated the population to have risen again to 350.

Film star Robert Redford visited a pub in the village with friends in March 2011 while in the UK to promote the Sundance London Film Festival.

References

External links

Civil parishes in North Yorkshire
Selby District
Villages in North Yorkshire